El (Л л Or Ʌ ʌ; italics: Л л or Ʌ ʌ) is a letter of the Cyrillic script.

El commonly represents the alveolar lateral approximant . In Slavic languages it may be either palatalized or slightly velarized; see below.

Allography
In some typefaces the Cyrillic letter El has a grapheme which may be confused with the Cyrillic letter Pe (Пп). Note that Pe has a straight left leg, without the hook. An alternative form of El (Ʌ ʌ) is more common in Russian, Ukrainian, Belarusian, Bulgarian, Macedonian, and Serbian.

History
The Cyrillic letter El was derived from the Greek letter lambda (Λ λ).

In the Cyrillic numeral system, Л had a value of 30.

Pronunciation
As used in the alphabets of various languages, El represents the following sounds:
 palatalized alveolar lateral approximant 
 voiced alveolar lateral fricative  and its palatalized equivalent 

Serbian and Macedonian orthographies use a separate letter Љ for the soft  – it looks as a ligature of El with the soft sign (Ь). In these languages,  denotes only hard .

Slavic languages except Serbian and Macedonian use another orthographic convention to distinguish between hard and soft , so  can denote either variant depending on the subsequent letter.

The pronunciations shown in the table are the primary ones for each language.

In addition, л was formerly used in Chukchi to represent the voiceless alveolar lateral fricative  but has since been replaced by ԓ.

Related letters and other similar characters
Λ λ : Greek letter Lambda
Љ љ : Cyrillic letter Lje
Ӆ ӆ : Cyrillic letter El with tail
Ԓ ԓ : Cyrillic letter El with hook
Ԯ ԯ : Cyrillic letter El with descender
L l : Latin letter L
Ł ł : Latin letter L with stroke

Computing codes

External links

References